Glandularia gooddingii is a species of flowering plant in the verbena family known by the common name southwestern mock vervain. It is native to the southwestern United States and northern Mexico, where it occurs in sandy and rocky desert habitat. It is a perennial herb producing several hairy, decumbent to erect stems up to 45 centimeters long. The hairy leaves are generally divided at the base into a few lobes, which are edged with large teeth or small lobes. The plant blooms in large, dense, head-like spikes of many flowers. Each flower has a calyx of hairy sepals and a pale purple-blue corolla up to 1.4 centimeters long.

External links
Jepson Manual Treatment
Photo gallery

Verbenaceae